Pycnandra blanchonii is a species of plant in the family Sapotaceae. It is endemic to New Caledonia.

References

blanchonii
Endangered plants
Taxonomy articles created by Polbot
Taxa named by André Aubréville